Following the Russian invasion of Ukraine in late February 2014, and again after February 2022, countries placed international sanctions on Russia and Crimea as the Russo-Ukrainian War continued. Leading economic and political powers, such as the United States and members of the European Union (EU), as well as international organisations, established sanctions against Russian and Ukrainian  individuals, businesses and officials. In response, Russia imposed its own sanctions against other countries, including a total ban on food imports from Australia, Canada, Norway, the United States, and the European Union.

By Canada, the United Kingdom, the United States, the European Union and Australia

Prior to 2022 invasion 
The European Union, United States, and Canada imposed an initial round of sanctions on 17 March 2014 and, on 11 April, Albania, Iceland and Montenegro announced that they would be following suit. On 28 April, the US expanded its sanctions to include 17 Russian companies, with Japan, Canada, and Australia, taking similar actions soon thereafter.

The EU also joined the 28 April sanctions and, in addition, instructed the European Investment Bank and the European Bank for Reconstruction and Development to suspend the signature of new financing operations in Russia. The EU continued to expand the scope and duration its sanctions repeatedly over the following months, agreeing to extend the existing sanctions on 150 individuals and 38 companies for another six months in March 2018, and adding five individuals to their sanctions lists for their involvement with and organisation of the March 2018 Russia presidential elections in Crimea and Sevastopol that May. Switzerland, although not an EU member, mirrored the Union's sanctions, a historic deviation from the country's stance of semi-complete political and wartime neutrality, citing a  "serious violation of the most fundamental norms of international law [...] within the scope of its political room for manoeuvre."

New Zealand imposed "largely symbolic" sanctions in May 2014, and, that September, Australia placed Russia, Crimea, and Sevastopol on the Australian autonomous sanctions list in response to the Russian threat to the sovereignty and territorial integrity of Ukraine, while Japan sanctioned Russian military-related technology and five major Russian banks (VTB Bank, Sberbank, Gazprombank, Vnesheconombank, and the Russian Agricultural Bank).

Since first imposing its sanctions in 2014, the United States expanded them several times, including in December 2015 and April 2018.

As of 24 May 2018, Ukraine's sanctions list named more than 1000 individuals and more than 400 entities.

After 2022 invasion

Personal sanctions

Organizational sanctions

Removal from sanction list
In early-March 2014, the European Union froze all funds belonging to Raisa Bogatyrova on suspicion of her illegal use of budget funds. It was reported in 2016 that, according to the Ukrainian government, she had since repaid government funds that had been allegedly misappropriated. For this, her funds in the EU were unfrozen on 6 March 2016.

Frozen accounts and property

22 March 2022 statistics

By Russia

Prior to 2022
In May 2014, Russia sanctioned more individuals of the United States and Canada, but the list has not yet been revealed.

After a member of the German Bundestag was denied entry into Russia in May 2015, Russia released a blacklist to European Union governments of 89 politicians and officials from the EU who are not allowed entry into Russia under the present sanctions regime. Russia asked for the blacklist to not be made public. The list is said to include eight Swedes, as well as two MPs and two MEPs from the Netherlands. Finland's national broadcaster Yle published a leaked German version of the list.

In winter 2014/15, three politicians from Lithuania, Latvia, and Poland, respectively, were blocked from entering Russia.

On October 22, 2018, Russian President Vladimir Putin signed a decree on special economic measures in relation to Ukraine's unfriendly actions against Russian individuals and entities. On August 21, 2021, Russia expanded its economic sanctions on Ukrainian individuals to include Foreign Minister Dmytro Kuleba and National Security and Defense Council Secretary Oleksiy Danilov. The updated version of the list of sanctioned individuals, approved by Russian Prime Minister Mikhail Mishustin, was published on the government website containing legal information. The sanctions include freezing non-cash accounts and other assets in Russia and a ban on capital transfers from Russia. The number of sanctioned Ukrainian individuals rose from 849 to 922.

Removal from sanction list

Russia have lifted targeted sanctions to allow US Under Secretary of State for Political Affairs Victoria Nuland to visit Moscow for meetings with Russian officials on October 12, 2021.

Maria Zakharova, spokeswoman for Russia's Foreign Ministry, said Nuland was on the sanctions list that prohibits individuals from entering the country, but has since been removed after the US nixed a similar restriction barring a Russian citizen from entering the country.

"Indeed, she was on a sanction list. It means that such a person cannot cross the border. They put Russian representatives on their sanction lists, hence, in this case the matter was settled on the parity basis," said Zakharova in an interview on the Rossiya 1 television channel.

Zakharova confirmed that the US had removed some Russian representatives from their sanction lists, and said Nuland's visit to Russia was requested by the US."I think our Western partners should analyze this approach and understand that we can respond in a negative manner to negative things. We can also respond in a positive manner to positive things and have always been opting for the latter," she said. Zakharova later clarified to Govorit Moskva radio that one Russian citizen had been removed from the US sanctions list, but she did not disclose the person's name.

Post 24 February 2022

Personal sanctions

Against US
On March 15, 2022, the Ministry of Foreign Affairs of the Russian Federation (MFARF) said it had imposed sanctions on US President Joe Biden and 12 other US officials. The MFARF released a statement on April 13, 2022 announcing sanctions against 398 members of the U.S. House of Representatives. On May 21, 2022, the MFARF published on its website list US citizens who are banned from entering Russia on a permanent basis. The "stop list" included 963 people. Russia has imposed personal sanctions on 61 U.S. officials including Treasury Secretary Janet Yellen and Energy Secretary Jennifer Granholm and leading defence and media executives, the Russian foreign ministry said on June 6, 2022. US President Joe Biden's wife and daughter have been banned from Russia, along with 23 other Americans, the MFARF said on June 28, 2022. On September 5, 2022, the Russian foreign ministry prohibited 25 high-ranking officials, business people and actors from entering Russia "on a permanent basis." The move comes in retaliation for U.S. President Joe Biden's sanctions against Moscow, the press release added. The Russian Foreign Ministry has sanctioned 200 U.S. nationals in retaliation for American sanctions on November 11, 2022 . Notable persons include the immediate family of U.S. President Biden, Officials and their immediate family and Lawmakers. With these additions, the Russian Foreign Ministry has now sanctioned 1,073 Americans.

Russia has imposed personal sanctions on 77 U.S. politicians and officials, the Russian foreign ministry said on February 8, 2023. On February 16, 2023, The Migration Service of the Moscow police has slapped a 40-year entry ban to Russia on American citizen Alicia Day, who was detained two weeks ago after walking a calf along Moscow’s Red Square.

Against Canada
A total of 313 Canadian officials and MPs including Prime Minister Justin Trudeau were blacklisted by Russia on March 15. On April 13, Russia sanctioned 87 Canadian senators. On April 28, the Russian Foreign Ministry published a list of 592 Canadian citizens that are permanently barred from entering the country. Moscow is set to bar entry permissions for 26 nationals of Canada in response to the country's earlier announced measures, the MFARF said on May 21, 2022. Russia on June 3, 2022 announced a travel ban on 41 Canadian citizens, including several members of the Ukrainian Canadian Congress, in retaliation for "anti-Russian" sanctions imposed on Moscow over Ukraine. Russia sanctioned 43 Canadian citizens on June 27, 2022, barring them from entering the country in a tit-for-tat response to Western sanctions on Moscow. Moscow barred entry to 62 Canadian citizens in response to another expansion of anti-Russian sanctions by Ottawa, Russian Foreign Ministry said in its statement on August 5, 2022. Moscow barred entry to 55 Canadian and American citizens in response to another expansion of anti-Russian sanctions by Ottawa, Russian Foreign Ministry said in its statement on August 31, 2022. The Russian Foreign Ministry announced on September 22, 2022 that an additional 87 Canadian citizens have been indefinitely barred from entering the country in response to Ottawa's anti-Russian sanctions. The newly-blacklisted are Canada's regional leaders, senior military officers, heads of companies supplying Ukraine with weapons and dual-use technologies, the ministry said in a statement. A total of 905 Canadians have been under Moscow's sanctions, including a travel ban, official data show. Russia's Foreign Ministry announced on November 14, 2022 that 100 Canadians have been added to the list of people banned from entering the country in response to sanctions against Russia by Canada. In response to Ottawa's sanctions, Russia has blacklisted 200 Canadians, banning them from entering the country, the Russian Foreign Ministry said in a statement on December 9, 2022. In total, the list of Canadian citizens who are permanently barred entry to the Russian Federation includes 1,204 names.

Against Australia and New Zealand
On April 7, 2022, the Russian Foreign Ministry announced sanctions on 228 members of the Australian government and 130 members of the New Zealand government, including their prime ministers and other high-ranking members of Cabinet. The MFARF said on June 16, 2022 that it was sanctioning an additional 121 Australian citizens, including journalists and defence officials, citing what it calls a "Russophobic agenda" in the country. Russia has added 39 representatives of Australian security services and defence companies to a "stop-list" that bars them from entering the country, in response to a sanctions law adopted by Canberra, the Russian foreign ministry said on July 21, 2022. Russia imposed sanctions on 32 citizens of New Zealand, including representatives of the command of the country's armed forces and journalists, the Russian Foreign Ministry said on July 30, 2022. Russia has sanctioned another 41 Australian nationals from entering the country, the foreign ministry said on September 16, 2022.

The Russian Foreign Ministry announced on January 19, 2023 that 31 officials, journalists and public figures from New Zealand have been indefinitely barred from entering Russia.

Against UK
The MFARF released a statement on April 16, 2022 announcing sanctions against UK Prime Minister Boris Johnson and 12 other UK Officials. The MFARF released a statement on April 27, 2022 announcing sanctions against 287 British MPs. On May 24, 2022, Russia imposed sanctions against 154 members of the House of Lords of the British Parliament in response to London's decision to include almost the entire composition of the Russian Federation Council in the sanctions list. On June 14, 2022, Russia has imposed sanctions on 49 UK citizens, including journalists, defence officials and arms industry executives, in response to western punitive measures against Moscow over Putin's invasion of Ukraine. Russia has expanded its sanctions stop-list for British nationals, putting on it 39 politicians, business people and journalists, including the country's former Prime Minister David Cameron, the Russian Foreign Ministry said on August 1, 2022. On September 14, 2022, the Russian foreign ministry sanctioned 30 British citizens. In a statement, it said the British nationals included UK defense lobby representatives and were encouraging anti-Russian agenda.

Moscow has expanded its sanctions stop-list for British nationals, blackballing 36 politicians, security officials and journalists from the UK, the Russian Foreign Ministry said in a statement on January 12, 2023.The Russian Foreign Ministry on March 17, 2023 announced sanctions on 23 more British citizens in a retaliatory move.In a statement on its website, the ministry said officers of the British armed forces involved in the training of Ukrainian military against the Russian army, including commanders of formations that provided instructors for this purpose, have been put on Russia's stop list.Top officials of the Zinc Network Corporation were also put on the list of British citizens who are now barred from entering Russia, it said."In addition, restrictions have been imposed on a number of judges and officials of the UK penitentiary system involved in the harassment of independent journalists."In particular, representatives of the management of the maximum security prison Bermarsh in London, which is known for repeated cases of human rights violations were included in the 'stop list'," the ministry said.

Against European countries
Russia imposed an entry ban for 9 Icelandics, 16 Norwegians, 3 Greenlanders and 3 Faroe Islanders in retaliation for their joining the European Union sanctions, the MFARF said in a statement released on April 29, 2022. Russia banned entry to Minister of Foreign Affairs and Defence and former director of National Security Agency of Montenegro on October 14, 2022. Russia imposed sanctions against 52 key Irish officials and politicians, the Russian Foreign Ministry said in a statement on November 16, 2022.The Russian Foreign Ministry announced on March 9, 2023 that 144 citizens of Latvia, Lithuania and Estonia have been barred from entering Russia.The newly blacklisted are ministers, parliament members, public figures and journalists of the three countries, the ministry said in a statement, without disclosing their names.Russia imposed the travel ban in response to "the active lobbying by the Baltic states of sanctions and other measures against Russia, interference in its internal affairs, and inciting Russophobic sentiments," the statement said.

Against Japan
On May 4, 2022, Russia sanctioned 63 Japanese citizens. They include Prime Minister Fumio Kishida, Foreign Minister Yoshimasa Hayashi and other senior lawmakers. Russia on July 15, 2022 imposed sanctions against 384 members of Japan's parliament. Russia said the measures were taken against those who had "taken an unfriendly, anti-Russian position."

Against Ukraine

Several Kremlin-linked media outlets reported that 31 Ukrainian celebrities, TV presenters, and influencers are now banned from entering Russia for 50 years. The list includes singers Dmytro Monatik, Jamala, Svyatoslav Vakarchuk who is the lead singer of the rock band Okean Elzy, and more. All of them called out Russia for its war against Ukraine.

Organizational sanctions

In March 2015, the Russian Federal Service for Surveillance on Consumer Rights Protection and Human Well-being (Rospotrebnadzor) banned supplies of certain household chemicals made in Ukraine. In October 2015, Russia also established a ban on flights between Russia and Ukraine.

From 1 January 2016, Russia suspended the application of the Free Trade Agreement of the Commonwealth of Independent States ("CIS FTA") with respect to Ukraine because Ukraine entered into the Association Agreement with the EU providing Ukraine with access to the European single market in certain sectors. The CIS FTA partially entered into force on 1 January 2016 and became entirely effective on 1 September 2017. According to the CIS FTA, Ukraine cannot simultaneously participate in free trade zones with the EU and the CIS countries.

As a result of the suspension of the CIS FTA, the importation of goods originating from Ukraine to Russia has become subject to regular customs duties as specified in the Common Customs Tariff of the Eurasian Economic Union (EAEU). Russia also imposed a ban on the transit of certain goods (i.e., goods subject to customs duties other than 0% and the embargoed goods) by road and rail from Ukraine through Russia to Kazakhstan and Kyrgyzstan. The transit of nonrestricted goods (by road and rail) from Ukraine through Russia to Kazakhstan and Kyrgyzstan should be carried out only through the territory of Belarus, provided that such goods have identification and tracking means, including those that are operating on the basis of the Global Navigation Satellite System (GLONASS). The drivers of the vehicles, who are involved in road shipments, must have registration vouchers.

At the same time, the CIS FTA remains effective with regard to the exportation of natural gas in a gaseous state from Russia to Ukraine.

In May 2017, in response to Kyiv's ban on the operation of Russia's payment systems, Russia enacted a law restricting money transfers from Russia if a country restricts the operation of Russian payment systems in its territory. As a result, money transfers from Russia to Ukraine can only be performed via Russian systems. The new restrictions apply only to financial transfers conducted without opening a bank account.

In May 2017, Russia requested World Trade Organization (WTO) dispute consultations with Ukraine regarding the restrictions, prohibitions, requirements and procedures adopted and maintained by Ukraine in respect of trade in goods and services from Russia (Case No. DS525).

On 22 October 2018, the Russian president signed a decree calling for countersanctions against Ukraine and instructing the Russian government to draw up a list of companies and individuals that would be subject to economic restrictions under the new measures, and a list of the respective restrictions.On 29 December 2018, the Russian prime minister signed Resolution No. 1716-83 extending the import ban of Ukrainian goods (including agricultural products, raw materials, food products, industrial goods and certain personal hygiene products) ("Resolution No. 1716-83"). Resolution No. 1716-83 introduced an import ban with respect to listed goods: (i) originating from Ukraine; (ii) that are supplied from Ukraine; or (iii) that were in transit through the territory of Ukraine. The import ban does not apply to listed goods that are transferred through Russia to third countries (subject to certain conditions).

On 18 April 2019, the Russian government enacted Governmental Resolution No. 460-25, which introduced two more lists to Resolution No. 1716-83, namely: (i) a list of oil, oil products and other goods that could not be exported from Russia to Ukraine; and (ii) a list of certain fuel and energy products that, from 1 June 2019, could not be exported from Russia to Ukraine without the permission of the Russian Ministry of Economic Development.

During 2019, the Russian government amended the lists of goods subject to the import and/or export ban several times by adding new goods to these lists and lifting the import and/or export ban with respect to certain listed goods. Apart from that, the Russian government set specific dates for the entry into force of the import ban with respect to certain listed products. Russian Prime Minister Mikhail Mishustin signed a decree expanding the list of Ukrainian companies that have economic sanctions imposed on them in connection with unfriendly actions of Ukraine. The document was published on the official portal of legal information on Friday.

The document introduces amendments to Appendix No. 2 to the Decree of the Government of the Russian Federation of November 1, 2018 No. 1300 on Measures to implement the decree of the President of the Russian Federation No. 592 of October 22, 2018.

In the original version of the document, the list of legal entities subject to special economic measures consisted of 68 companies. Later it was expanded to 75 entities.

Now the list comprises 84 companies that have economic sanctions on them.The new list includes nine more companies, in particular – Donmar LLC, Kranship LLC, Transship LLC and Poltava Auto Unit Plant PJSC.

The Russian government has approved a list of legal entities, which are subject to retaliatory sanctions. The relevant resolution of the Cabinet of Ministers was published on the official portal of legal information on May 11, 2022.

The list includes 31 companies from Germany, France and other European countries, as well as from the US and Singapore. In particular, it includes former European subsidiaries of Gazprom, traders and operators of underground gas storage facilities.

In particular, Russian authorities, legal entities and citizens will not be able to conclude transactions with the sanctioned entities and organizations under their control, fulfill obligations to them under completed transactions, and conduct financial transactions in their favor. This includes the concluded foreign trade contracts. These bans were earlier established by a decree of Putin.

The resolution sets additional criteria for transactions that are prohibited from being performed with companies from the sanctions list. These are transactions concluded in favor of the sanctioned persons, or providing for the making of payments, transactions with securities with the participation or in favor of such companies, or transactions involving the entry of ships owned or chartered by sanctioned persons, in their interest or on their behalf, into the Russian ports.

The resolution appoints the Russian Finance Ministry responsible for sending proposals to the Cabinet of Ministers on making changes to the list, as well as on granting temporary permits for certain transactions with persons under sanctions. The document comes into force from the date of its official publication.

Russia's sanctions list includes Gazprom Germania GmbH, Gazprom Schweiz AG, Gazprom Marketing & Trading USA Inc, Vemex, Wingas, EuRoPol GAZ.

On October 11, Russia's financial monitoring agency, Rosfinmonitoring, has added US tech giant Meta Platforms Inc, the parent company of Instagram and Facebook, to its list of "terrorists and extremists".

On October 26, Russia banned dealings in the shares or share capital of 45 banks or banking units, all either owned by parties in countries that Russia terms "unfriendly" or owned through foreign capital.The list followed a decree issued on August 5 by President Vladimir Putin banning dealings in stakes in the financial and energy sectors owned by parties in "unfriendly" countries unless specific permission was given. The list, published on Wednesday, included Russian units of Intesa Sanpaolo, Credit Suisse, Raiffeisen, Citi, OTP Bank, Western Union DP Vostok and UniCredit. Subsidiaries of Deutsche Bank, the French group BNP Paribas, Goldman Sachs, UBS, HSBC, JPMorgan, PayPal service, American Express payment system and others as well as the Russian Yandex-Bank and Ozon-Bank were present.

The list also includes many players specializing in car loans – subsidiaries of foreign automakers: MS Bank Rus (Mitsubishi); RN-Bank (owned by UniCredit and Renault-Nissan-Mitsubishi); Toyota Bank (indirectly controlled by Toyota); Mercedes-Benz Bank Rus (Mercedes-Benz Group); BMW Bank (indirectly controlled by BMW).

Russia's government has approved a list of legal entities subject to special economic measures in the area of military-technical cooperation. A corresponding decree has been signed, the cabinet's press service said in a statement on November 8, 2022.

"The list contains 74 entities from Bulgaria, the UK, Germany, Canada, Lithuania, Slovakia, Poland, the Czech Republic, Montenegro, Estonia and the US. Deals with the companies on the list in the area of military-technical cooperation are banned," the statement said.

The decree has been prepared pursuant to an order by Russian President Vladimir Putin ‘On use of retaliatory special economic measures due to hostile actions of certain foreign states and international organizations’.

List

By Chechnya, against US and EU institutions' leaders
On 26 June 2014, the Head of the Russian republic of Chechnya, Ramzan Kadyrov, released a statement saying he created a sanction list including four individuals. The people on the list have been banned from entering the Chechen Republic and had all bank accounts frozen on 27 July 2014. This responds to the EU sanctions.

League overall timeline table

See also
Guantanamo List, the list of American officials barred from Russia
Persona non grata

Notes

References
 This article contains quotations from   The copyright holder of this document allows anyone to use it for any purpose, provided that the copyright holder is properly attributed. Redistribution, derivative work, commercial use, and all other uses are permitted.

Individuals sanctioned during the 2013-15 Ukrainian crisis
Individuals sanctioned
2014 in international relations
Articles containing video clips
International sanctions
Ukrainian crisis
Ukrainian crisis